Jon McBride is an American Z movie director, producer, screenwriter and actor.

Filmography

External links

Living people
American film directors
1960 births